Lepidagathis is a genus of plants in the family Acanthaceae.

Selected species
 Lepidagathis ananthapuramensis 
 Lepidagathis backeri
 Lepidagathis calycina
 Lepidagathis cristata
 Lepidagathis cuspidata
 Lepidagathis fasciculata
 Lepidagathis incurva
 Lepidagathis keralensis 
 Lepidagathis lutea
 Lepidagathis riedeliana
 Lepidagathis rigida
 Lepidagathis trinervis

References 

Acanthaceae
Acanthaceae genera
Flora of Pakistan